Brookby is a rural suburb of Auckland, New Zealand. Brookby is approximately 5 kilometres west of Clevedon and 5 km southeast of Whitford. Originally established as a farming community with few people living in the area, Brookby is now a fast-growing community. It has many newly built houses within the area. The suburb is in the Franklin ward, one of the thirteen administrative divisions of Auckland Council. It is situated in the Hunua Electorate.

Brookby was originally named Turanga Creek, until early residents realised their mail was being sent to Tauranga instead. The original post-office was located near a Brook (Papakura Stream), and so was named by the brook, or Brookby.

Demographics
The SA1 area is part of the larger Turanga statistical area.

The SA1 statistical area had a population of 195 at the 2018 New Zealand census, an increase of 9 people (4.8%) since the 2013 census, and an increase of 9 people (4.8%) since the 2006 census. There were 57 households, comprising 99 males and 93 females, giving a sex ratio of 1.06 males per female. The median age was 45.5 years (compared with 37.4 years nationally), with 33 people (16.9%) aged under 15 years, 39 (20.0%) aged 15 to 29, 108 (55.4%) aged 30 to 64, and 18 (9.2%) aged 65 or older.

Ethnicities were 90.8% European/Pākehā, 4.6% Māori, 3.1% Pacific peoples, 6.2% Asian, and 1.5% other ethnicities. People may identify with more than one ethnicity.

Although some people chose not to answer the census's question about religious affiliation, 49.2% had no religion, 44.6% were Christian and 3.1% were Buddhist.

Of those at least 15 years old, 42 (25.9%) people had a bachelor's or higher degree, and 18 (11.1%) people had no formal qualifications. The median income was $44,500, compared with $31,800 nationally. 54 people (33.3%) earned over $70,000 compared to 17.2% nationally. The employment status of those at least 15 was that 93 (57.4%) people were employed full-time, 33 (20.4%) were part-time, and 6 (3.7%) were unemployed.

Education

References

External links
Photographs of Brookby held in Auckland Libraries' heritage collections.

Populated places in the Auckland Region